Thomas Wetherhead  was Archdeacon of Cork and of Cloyne then Bishop of Waterford and Lismore  from 1589 until 1592.

References

Archdeacons of Cork
Archdeacons of Cloyne
Bishops of Waterford and Lismore (Church of Ireland)
1592 deaths